Lloyd Palun (born 28 November 1988) is a professional footballer who plays for Ligue 2 club Bastia. Born in France, he represents Gabon at international level. He plays as a right-back or as a defensive midfielder.

Club career
Palun joined Nice after playing with local amateur clubs Martigues and Trinité.

International career
Born in France, Palun elected to represent the Gabon national team at senior international level. He made his debut on 9 February 2011 in a 2–0 victory over Congo DR.

In 2012, he played in all four national team matches at the 2012 Africa Cup of Nations. Gabon reached the quarterfinals.

References

External links
 
 
 
 
 

Living people
1988 births
People from Arles
Sportspeople from Bouches-du-Rhône
People with acquired Gabonese citizenship
Gabonese footballers
Gabon international footballers
French footballers
French sportspeople of Gabonese descent
Association football midfielders
FC Martigues players
OGC Nice players
Red Star F.C. players
Cercle Brugge K.S.V. players
En Avant Guingamp players
SC Bastia players
Ligue 1 players
Ligue 2 players
Belgian Pro League players
Challenger Pro League players
2012 Africa Cup of Nations players
2015 Africa Cup of Nations players
2017 Africa Cup of Nations players
Gabonese expatriate footballers
French expatriate footballers
Gabonese expatriate sportspeople in France
Expatriate footballers in France
Gabonese expatriate sportspeople in Belgium
French expatriate sportspeople in Belgium
Expatriate footballers in Belgium
2021 Africa Cup of Nations players
Footballers from Provence-Alpes-Côte d'Azur